Charlton Joseph Kadio Hinman (1911 in Fort Collins, CO – 16 March 1977 in Rockville, MD) was the editor of the Shakespeare Quarto Facsimiles and The Norton Facsimile: The First Folio of Shakespeare. He is well known as the inventor of the Hinman Collator.

Hinman attended the University of Oxford as a Rhodes scholar, receiving both his bachelor's and master's degrees there. He later received his doctoral degree in 1941 from the University of Virginia, as Fredson Bowers' first Ph.D. candidate. He was associated with the Folger Shakespeare Library and was professor of English at the University of Kansas from 1960 to 1976.

References

Sources

1911 births
1977 deaths
American bibliographers
University of Kansas faculty
University of Virginia alumni
20th-century American non-fiction writers
American Rhodes Scholars
20th-century American engineers
20th-century American inventors